Mount Palmer is a mountain with an elevation of   in the southern part of the Northern Territory of Australia. It is part of the Central Desert Region and was named by the explorer Ernest Giles. Nearby settlements include Hart Range.

See also

 List of mountains of the Northern Territory

References

Palmer